William Ronald McNeill (January 26, 1936 – August 31, 2007) was a Canadian professional ice hockey player. He played in the National Hockey League with the Detroit Red Wings between 1956 and 1963. The rest of his career, which lasted from 1953 to 1971, was mainly spent in the minor Western Hockey League.

Early life 
McNeill broke in with the local junior team, the Edmonton Oil Kings in 1951. He also played 49 games in 1954-55 with the Hamilton Tiger Cubs of the Ontario Hockey Association junior league.

Professional career

Edmonton and Detroit 
In 1955 McNeill turned pro with the local Edmonton Flyers of the WHL, who played their games in the old Edmonton Gardens. In 1956 McNeill was called up to the Detroit Red Wings in the NHL following serious injuries to Alex Delvecchio and Bill Dineen. During the next eight seasons, he was called up from the Flyers six times, playing 257 games in the NHL.

On February 5, 1960, McNeill was to be traded to the New York Rangers with Red Kelly for Bill Gadsby and Eddie Shack, but Kelly and McNeill refused to report and the transaction was cancelled. As a result, Kelly temporarily retired and McNeill was suspended for the rest of the season. New York then picked him up in an intra-league draft in June of that year, only to trade him back to Detroit in January 1961, who in turn assigned him back to the Flyers in Edmonton.

In the six seasons he played for Detroit, he wore sweater numbers 19 and 15.

Later WHL career 
In January 1964, McNeill was traded by Detroit to the Vancouver Canucks (of the WHL) for Barrie Ross and future considerations. In Vancouver he began six seasons with the Canucks wearing sweater number 16. He became an enduring star player and perennial fan favourite in the PNE Forum arena, winning the Leader Cup as MVP of the WHL two years' running, in 1965 and 1966. He was also selected to the WHL's First All-Star team both those years. He was known for his short stick with a rounded bottom to the blade.

His best season as a pro was 1965-'66 in Vancouver when he finished with 40 goals and 62 assists, both career highs. He tied Portland's Art Jones for second place in league scoring. He also had 6 goals and 13 points in the playoffs that year.

On August 19, 1969, he was traded by Vancouver to the Salt Lake Golden Eagles for Germain Gagnon and cash. He missed most of the 1969-70 season with an ankle injury suffered against Phoenix in November 1969. McNeill retired after the 1971 season while with the San Diego Gulls, scoring 29 points in 64 games and appearing in six playoff games.

Assist on record-breaking goal 

McNeill assisted on Gordie Howe's (then) record-breaking 545th goal in November 1963.

It was McNeill's first assist of the season. He told reporter Pat Curran that it was a "perfect goal." "Bill Gadsby was yelling at me on one side and Gordie was shouting on the other and telling me to take the lead out. He knew we had a three-on-two break. When I dumped the puck over he shot past (Canadiens' goalie Charlie) Hodge on the short side." Montreal Canadiens' legends Jean Béliveau and Jacques Laperrière were defending on the play.

Career statistics

Regular season and playoffs

References

External links 
 

1936 births
2007 deaths
Canadian expatriate ice hockey players in the United States
Canadian ice hockey centres
Detroit Red Wings players
Edmonton Flyers (WHL) players
Edmonton Oil Kings (WCHL) players
Hamilton Tiger Cubs players
Pittsburgh Hornets players
Rochester Americans players
Salt Lake Golden Eagles (WHL) players
San Diego Gulls (WHL) players
Ice hockey people from Edmonton
Vancouver Canucks (WHL) players